Zhang Dechang (born 23 August 1978) is a Chinese rower. He competed in the men's eight event at the 2008 Summer Olympics.

References

External links
 

1978 births
Living people
Chinese male rowers
Olympic rowers of China
Rowers at the 2008 Summer Olympics
Rowers from Shandong
Asian Games medalists in rowing
Rowers at the 2002 Asian Games
Rowers at the 2010 Asian Games
Asian Games gold medalists for China
Medalists at the 2002 Asian Games
Medalists at the 2010 Asian Games
People from Jining
Rowers at the 2020 Summer Olympics
Medalists at the 2020 Summer Olympics
Olympic medalists in rowing
Olympic bronze medalists for China
20th-century Chinese people
21st-century Chinese people